Alexander Stronach was a Protestant Christian missionary who served with the London Missionary Society during the late Qing Dynasty in China.

Works authored or edited

References

Notes

Protestant missionaries in China
Protestant writers
English Protestant missionaries
British expatriates in China